Lechaschau is a municipality in the district of Reutte in the Austrian state of Tyrol.

Geography
Lechaschau lies in the Reutte basin on the left bank of the Lech.

The village consists of three parts:
The village's center, the so-called Buchenort and Weidasiedlung.

Lake Frauensee, used for swimming, is part of the village.

References

Cities and towns in Reutte District